SOL: Exodus is the first episode in a series of space combat simulator games by Bit Plantes Games (formerly Seamless Entertainment), an independent game developer located in Austin, Texas, released on January 25, 2012. Two episodes, The Battle of Sol and The Fleets of Sol were released in 2015.

Gameplay
The game is set in the Solar System, and features both dogfighting and battles with capital ships.  The game is described by the designers as being in the spirit of older space combat simulators such as Wing Commander, FreeSpace, Descent and Star Wars: X-Wing.

References

External links
 
 Seamless Entertainment official site

2012 video games
Science fiction video games
Space combat simulators
Video games developed in the United States
Windows games
Windows-only games
Headup Games games
Single-player video games